Lim Hyun-Gyu (born January 16, 1985), often anglicized to Hyun Gyu Lim, is a South Korean mixed martial artist, who formerly competed in the UFC Welterweight division.

Mixed martial arts career

Biography and early career
He first experienced martial arts when he was 13 years old training in Boxing, and started training in Taekwondo in his midteens. But these trainings were just as hobbies. So later he felt eagerness to pursue martial arts as a professional. After finishing a mandatory military service in his country, he was scouted by the head coach of his current team while training in his boxing gym. After only three months scouted, Lim made his professional MMA debut in February 2006 in the Spirit MC promotion in his native South Korea. Over the next few years, he also fought for the Heat, DEEP, M-1 Global and Pacific Xtreme Combat promotions. After beating Ryan Biglar at the PXC 32 event in July 2012, he became the PXC welterweight champion.

Ultimate Fighting Championship
In August 2012, the UFC announced that they had signed Lim. Lim was originally set to make his UFC debut against Marcelo Guimarães on November 10, 2012, at UFC on Fuel TV 6. However, Guimarães was forced out of the bout with an injury and replaced by David Mitchell.  Then, just prior to the weigh in for the event, the bout was scrapped after Lim was declared medically unfit to compete by UFC doctors.

Lim vs. Guimarães was then rescheduled for March 3, 2013, at UFC on Fuel TV 8. Lim was successful in his debut, winning via KO in the second round.

Lim faced Pascal Krauss on August 31, 2013, at UFC 164. He defeated Krauss by KO with a knee and follow up punches in the first round.  The win also earned Lim his first Fight of the Night bonus award.

Lim was expected to face Kiichi Kunimoto on January 4, 2014, at UFC Fight Night 34.  However, in late November, event headliner Jake Ellenberger pulled out of the event citing an injury and Lim stepped up to face Tarec Saffiedine in the main event.  He lost the fight via unanimous decision. Despite the loss on the scorecards, the bout brought Lim his second consecutive Fight of the Night bonus award.

Lim next faced Takenori Sato on September 20, 2014, at UFC Fight Night 52. He won the fight via TKO in the first round.

Lim faced Neil Magny on May 16, 2015, at UFC Fight Night 66.  He lost the fight via TKO in the second round.

Lim was expected to face Dominique Steele on November 28, 2015, at UFC Fight Night 79. However, Lim pulled out of the fight in the week leading up to the event and was replaced by promotional newcomer Dong Hyun Kim.

Lim was expected to face Sultan Aliev on August 20, 2016, at UFC 202. However, Aliev pulled out of the fight in early August citing a wrist injury. Lim faced promotional newcomer Mike Perry. He lost the fight via TKO in the first round.

Lim faced Daichi Abe at UFC Fight Night 117 on September 23, 2017. He lost the fight by unanimous decision.

On October 23, 2018, it was reported that Lim was released from UFC.

Double G FC 
On November 18, 2018, Lim faced Igor Svirid at Double G FC's inaugural event in Seoul, South Korea.  He won the fight via unanimous decision.

Championships and accomplishments
 Pacific Xtreme Combat
 PXC Welterweight Championship (One time)
 Ultimate Fighting Championship
 Fight of the Night (Two times)
 MMAJunkie.com
 2014 January Fight of the Month vs. Tarec Saffiedine

Mixed martial arts record

|Win
|align=center|14–7–1
|Igor Svirid
|Decision (unanimous)
|Double G FC 1
|
|align=center|3
|align=center|5:00
|Seoul, South Korea
| 
|-
|Loss
|align=center|13–7–1
|Daichi Abe
|Decision (unanimous)
|UFC Fight Night: Saint Preux vs. Okami 
|
|align=center|3
|align=center|5:00
|Saitama, Japan
|
|-
|Loss
|align=center|13–6–1
| Mike Perry
|TKO (punches)
|UFC 202 
|
|align=center|1
|align=center|3:38
|Las Vegas, Nevada, United States
|
|-
| Loss
| align=center| 13–5–1
| Neil Magny
| TKO (punches)
| UFC Fight Night: Edgar vs. Faber
| 
| align=center| 2
| align=center| 1:24
| Pasay, Philippines
| 
|-
| Win
| align=center| 13–4–1
| Takenori Sato
| TKO (elbows)
| UFC Fight Night: Hunt vs. Nelson
| 
| align=center| 1
| align=center| 1:18
| Saitama, Japan
| 
|-
| Loss
| align=center| 12–4–1
| Tarec Saffiedine
| Decision (unanimous)
| UFC Fight Night: Saffiedine vs. Lim
| 
| align=center| 5
| align=center| 5:00
| Marina Bay, Singapore
| 
|-
| Win
| align=center| 12–3–1
| Pascal Krauss
| KO (knee and punches)
| UFC 164
| 
| align=center| 1
| align=center| 3:58
| Milwaukee, Wisconsin, United States
| 
|-
| Win
| align=center| 11–3–1
| Marcelo Guimarães
| KO (knee and punches)
| UFC on Fuel TV: Silva vs. Stann
| 
| align=center| 2
| align=center| 4:00
| Saitama, Japan
| 
|-
| Win
| align=center| 10–3–1
| Ryan Biglar
| Submission (guillotine choke)
| Pacific Xtreme Combat 32
| 
| align=center| 1
| align=center| 0:53
| Mangilao, Guam
| 
|-
| Win
| align=center| 9–3–1
| Takahiro Kawanaka
| TKO (corner stoppage)
| Pacific Xtreme Combat 30
| 
| align=center| 1
| align=center| 1:12
| Mangilao, Guam
| 
|-
| Win
| align=center| 8–3–1
| Ferrid Kheder
| TKO (punches)
| Pacific Xtreme Combat 27
| 
| align=center| 1
| align=center| N/A
| Mangilao, Guam
| 
|-
| Win
| align=center| 7–3–1
| Ross Ebanez
| TKO (punches)
| Pacific Xtreme Combat 26
| 
| align=center| 1
| align=center| 1:44
| Manila, Philippines
| 
|-
| Win
| align=center| 6–3–1
| Slade Adelbai
| TKO (punches)
| Rites of Passage 8: Fearless
| 
| align=center| 1
| align=center| 3:10
| Saipan, Northern Mariana Islands
| 
|-
| Loss
| align=center| 5–3–1
| Dmitry Samoilov
| Decision (unanimous)
| M-1 Challenge 12: USA
| 
| align=center| 2
| align=center| 5:00
| Tacoma, Washington, United States
| 
|-
| Loss
| align=center| 5–2–1
| Max Fernandez
| Submission (Achilles lock)
| Heat 8
| 
| align=center| 1
| align=center| 1:22
| Tokyo, Japan
| 
|-
| Win
| align=center| 5–1–1
| Brandon Magana
| Submission (armbar)
| M-1 Challenge 6: Korea
| 
| align=center| 2
| align=center| 3:58
| South Korea
| 
|-
| Win
| align=center| 4–1–1
| Noboru Onishi
| TKO (doctor stoppage)
| Deep: 35 Impact
| 
| align=center| 2
| align=center| 0:48
| Tokyo, Japan
| 
|-
| Win
| align=center| 3–1–1
| Lucio Linhares
| KO (punch)
| M-1 Challenge 2: Russia
| 
| align=center| 1
| align=center| 0:17
| Saint Petersburg, Russia 
| 
|-
| Win
| align=center| 2–1–1
| Hiroshi Masabuchi
| TKO (punches)
| Heat 6
| 
| align=center| 1
| align=center| 3:47
| Aichi, Japan
| 
|-
| Loss
| align=center| 1–1–1
| Greg Soto
| Submission (armbar)
| World Best Fighter: USA vs. Asia
| 
| align=center| 1
| align=center| 0:58
| Atlantic City, New Jersey, United States
| 
|-
| Draw
| align=center| 1–0–1
| Jick-Yong Kim
| Draw
| Spirit MC: Interleague 4
| 
| align=center| 3
| align=center| 5:00
| Seoul, South Korea
| 
|-
| Win
| align=center| 1–0
| Seong-Yeol Ahn
| Decision (unanimous)
| Spirit MC: Interleague 3
| 
| align=center| 2
| align=center| 5:00
| Seoul, South Korea
|

See also
 List of current UFC fighters
 List of male mixed martial artists

References

External links
 
 

1985 births
Living people
Sportspeople from Seoul
South Korean male mixed martial artists
Welterweight mixed martial artists
Mixed martial artists utilizing taekwondo
Mixed martial artists utilizing boxing
Mixed martial artists utilizing Ssireum
Ultimate Fighting Championship male fighters
South Korean male taekwondo practitioners
South Korean ssireum practitioners